Doctor Siyabonga Sangweni (born 29 September 1981 in Empangeni, KwaZulu-Natal), known as Siyabonga Sangweni, is a retired South African soccer defender who used to play for Premier Soccer League club Orlando Pirates and South Africa.

His younger brother Thamsanqa Sangweni is also a footballer and he also played for Orlando Pirates.

Club career

Golden Arrows

Nsimbi as he is efficiently known as in the football circles sign for Abafana Bes'thende in 2005 from SAFA Second Division side Uthukela. He played well for Arrows and contributed to the club's first major silverware which was the MTN 8 in 2009. He attracted many clubs and eventually signed for Orlando Pirates in 2011.

Orlando Pirates

Sangweni signed with Orlando Pirates at the beginning of the 2011/12 season. Hailed as one of the best signings of the season due to his defensive abilities. He was a regular starter for Bafana Bafana while playing for Golden Arrows. Siyabonga became a regular at Orlando Pirates and went on to have 28 league appearances in his first season at Pirates. Due to him being very instrumental in the Pirates treble winning of the season, he was nominated as a Footballer of the Season which eventually went to the League's leading goalscorer, Siyabonga Nomvethe of Swallows.
He has enjoyed much game-time along Lucky Lekgwathi and Rooi Mahamutsa. He got an injury that kept him to almost all the 2013/14 season.

Retirement 

In a press conference on 7 April 2016, Pirates' chairman Irvin Khoza announced that Sangweni has been plagued by a string of injuries. Khoza said that after consultation, the medics have confirmed that the former Bafana Bafana centre back has to end his career early.
Khoza said Sangweni, who has 29 Bafana caps with four goals, will be remembered as a club legend.

Career statistics

International goals

Honours

Lamontville Golden Arrows

 MTN 8: 2009

Orlando Pirates

 MTN 8: 2011
 Telkom Knockout: 2011
 Nedbank Cup: 2013–14
 Premier Soccer League: 2011–12
 CAF Champions League: Runners-up 2013
 CAF Confederation Cup: Runners-up 2015

See also

 List of African association football families

References

External links

1981 births
Living people
People from Empangeni
South African soccer players
Association football defenders
South Africa international soccer players
Lamontville Golden Arrows F.C. players
2010 FIFA World Cup players
Orlando Pirates F.C. players
2013 Africa Cup of Nations players
Nathi Lions F.C. players